WLKS-FM (102.9 FM) is a radio station  broadcasting a country music format. Licensed to West Liberty, Kentucky, United States.  The station is currently owned by Morgan County Industries, Inc.

References

External links

LKS-FM
Country radio stations in Kentucky
West Liberty, Kentucky